The 2017–18 Lafayette Leopards women's basketball team represents Lafayette College during the 2017–18 NCAA Division I women's basketball season. The Leopards, led by first year head coach Kia Damon, play their home games at Kirby Sports Center and were members of the Patriot League. They finished the season 11–19, 6–11 in Patriot League play to finish in eighth place. They advanced to the quarterfinals of the Patriot League women's tournament where they lost to American.

Previous season
They finished the season 4–28, 2–16 in Patriot League play to finish in last place. They advanced to the quarterfinals of the Patriot League women's tournament where they lost to Navy.

Roster

Schedule

|-
!colspan=9 style=| Non-conference regular season

|-
!colspan=9 style=| Patriot League regular season

|-
!colspan=9 style=| Patriot League Women's Tournament

See also
 2017–18 Lafayette Leopards men's basketball team

References

Lafayette
Lafayette Leopards women's basketball seasons
Lafayette
Lafayette